Twelfth can mean:
The Twelfth Amendment to the United States Constitution
The Twelfth, a Protestant celebration originating in Ireland

In mathematics:
 12th, an ordinal number; as in the item in an order twelve places from the beginning, following the eleventh and preceding the thirteenth
 1/12, a vulgar fraction, one part of a unit divided equally into twelve parts

Music
 The note twelve scale degrees from the root (current note, in a chord)
 The interval (music) (that is, gap) between the root and the twelfth note: a compound fifth

Currency

Uncia (coin), a Roman coin worth 12th of an As

See also
12 (number)
Eleventh
Thirteenth